Ted D. Clark (June 12, 1920 – May 3, 1980) was an American politician from the state of Iowa.

Clark was born in Detroit, Michigan in 1920 and moved with his parents to Appanoose County, Iowa a year later. He graduated from Mystic High School. He served as a Republican in both the Iowa House of Representatives from 1949 to 1953, and in the Iowa Senate from 1953 to 1957. Clark died in 1980 and was interred in Highland Cemetery in Mystic, Iowa.

References

|-

1920 births
1980 deaths
Politicians from Detroit
People from Appanoose County, Iowa
Republican Party members of the Iowa House of Representatives
Republican Party Iowa state senators
20th-century American politicians